Timothy Ian Walton (born August 6, 1972) is an American college softball coach and a former college and professional baseball player.  Walton is currently the head coach of the Florida Gators softball team of the University of Florida.

He has a 839-182 (.822) record at Florida. He is a five-time SEC Coach of the Year and helped the Gators set the SEC single-season record wins at 27 and NCAA single-season record wins at 70 in 2008. Ten years later, he helped them set the NCAA record for the most walks at 360 that season. 

Walton has led the Gators to 8 SEC regular season championships, 5 SEC championships, 14 Regional appearances, 12 Super Regional appearances, and 10 Women's College World Series appearances with back-to-back Women's College World Series Championships in 2014 and 2015. With that success, he and his coaching staff won the 2015 NFCA Division I National Coaching Staff of the Year and are five time NFCA Southeast Region Coaching Staff of the Year Selections. Walton has been able to breed 43 NFCA All-American honors, 62 All-SEC honors, 2 USA Softball Player of the Year recipients, 3 Honda Award winners, 10 SEC Player and Pitcher of the Year honorees, and one NFCA Freshman of the Year. Players under Coach Walton have excelled off the field with 18 CoSIDA Academic All-American honors, 127 appearances in the SEC Honor Roll, and 55 SEC Academic Honor Roll First-Year recipients. 

Walton graduated from the University of Oklahoma with a degree in history. He played professional baseball with the Philadelphia Phillies from 1995 to 1997. He is married and has two sons and a daughter.

Playing career 

Walton first attended Cerritos College in his hometown of Cerritos, California, where he played for the Cerritos Falcons baseball team in 1992 and 1993.  After his sophomore year, he transferred to the University of Oklahoma in Norman, Oklahoma, where he was a two-year letter-winner for the Oklahoma Sooners baseball team in 1994 and 1995.  As a Sooner baseball player, Walton participated in two consecutive College World Series, earning a win in the Sooners' 13–5 victory over the Georgia Tech Yellow Jackets in the 1994 College World Series championship game.  He graduated from the university with his bachelor's degree in history in 1996.

After college, he played with the Philadelphia Phillies minor league organization for two seasons.

Coaching career 

Walton was an assistant coach for the Oklahoma Sooners softball team of his alma mater, the University of Oklahoma, for four seasons from 1999 to 2002.  He accepted the head coaching position for the Wichita State Shockers softball team at Wichita State University after the 2002 season, and tallied a three-season win–loss record of 123–64 from 2003 to 2005.

After taking over the Florida Gators softball program in 2006, Walton has compiled an overall win–loss record of 331–80 (.805) as the Gators' head coach.  All six of his Gators teams have qualified for the NCAA Tournament.  In both 2008 and 2009, the Gators won the Southeastern Conference championship and the SEC tournament title.  Since 2008, eight of his ten Gators teams have advanced to the Women's College World Series in Oklahoma City, with his 2014 and 2015 teams winning the NCAA championship.

Personal 

Walton is married to the former Samantha Rhoten, who played basketball at Oral Roberts University.  The Waltons have two sons and a daughter.

Head coaching record

See also 

 2006 Florida Gators softball season
 2007 Florida Gators softball season
 2008 Florida Gators softball season
 2009 Florida Gators softball season
 2010 Florida Gators softball season
 Florida Gators
 History of the University of Florida
 List of University of Oklahoma alumni
 University Athletic Association

References

External links 
 Tim Walton – Official biography at GatorZone.com.

1972 births
Living people
American softball coaches
Florida Gators softball coaches
Cerritos Falcons baseball players
Oklahoma Sooners baseball players
Oklahoma Sooners softball coaches
Oral Roberts Golden Eagles baseball coaches
People from Cerritos, California
Wichita State Shockers softball coaches
Softball coaches from California
Baseball players from California
Baseball pitchers